"Post to Be" is a song by American singer Omarion featuring fellow American singers Chris Brown and Jhené Aiko from the former's fourth studio album, Sex Playlist (2014). The artists co-wrote the song alongside Ty Dolla $ign and producer DJ Mustard. The track was released as the album's second single on November 11, 2014. Musically the song is a hip hop club track that is built over a clap-heavy West Coast production. The song contains a "bouncy" production and samples Chaka Demus & Pliers' 1993 song "Murder She Wrote".  The word "post" is a sensational spelling of the word "supposed."

Commercially, the song peaked at number thirteen on the US Billboard Hot 100 and number five on the US Billboard Hot R&B/Hip-Hop Songs chart and in doing so tied with "Ice Box" as his highest peaking single. The track also made appearances on charts in Canada, Belgium and the UK. The song was later certified platinum by the Recording Industry Association of America (RIAA).

An accompanying music video was filmed in Los Angeles and was co-directed by Omarion along with Jay Ahn and Taz. The video premiered on February 17, 2015, and depicts the three musicians dancing on an all-white backdrop.

Background
Omarion sent the song to Aiko asking if she would make an appearance on the track; Aiko agreed due to her friendship with Omarion and began "playing with the rhyme scheme". While writing with longtime collaborator Micah Powell,  the lyric "Post To Be" reminded Aiko of rapper Kevin Gates,  and she told  Powell; 'Whatever we say, I really want to say something about eating the booty.' He keeps saying in the Vines—'You ’posed to eat the booty.'" Prior to the release of the song, Omarion released snippets. The song was later leaked on November 11, 2014, by the LA Leakers. The song was released as the album's second single on November 11, 2014, through Maybach Music Group and Atlantic Records.

Composition
"Post to Be" is composed in the key of D major with a tempo of 97 beats per minute. The song follows a chord progression of Bm–A–D–G.

Music video
On January 22, 2015, Omarion revealed via his official Instagram account that he was filming the song's accompanying video in Los Angeles. Via the Instagram account Omarion posted photos of himself, Brown, and Aiko alongside a white Ferrari and standing onset by an all-white backdrop. On February 16, 2015 Omarion posted two clips of the video on Instagram along with a caption saying "It’s coming…. #Posttobevideo", the clips depicted the three singers performing synchronized moves on an all-white set. The video was co-directed by Omarion along with Jay Ahn and Taz, and was released the following day on February 17, 2015. The video featured Omarion moonwalking in front of a white Ferrari, accompanied by Brown dancing.
Naomi Zeichner of The Fader praised the video comparing it to a home abs workout stating it "is four pure minutes of perfectly crisp mirror-dancing that doubles as a home abs workout." As of September 2019, this video has over 800 million views.

Remix
The official remix was released on May 8, 2015, featuring DeJ Loaf, Trey Songz, Ty Dolla Sign and Rick Ross.

Credits
Credits adapted from AllMusic.
Omarion - primary artist, composer 
Jhené Aiko - featured artist, composer
Chris Brown - featured artist, composer 
Tyrone Griffin - composer
 Samuel Sam Hook Jean - composer
Dijon McFarlane - composer, producer
Mikely Adam - composer
Bobby Turner - composer

Charts

Weekly charts

Year-end charts

Certifications

Release history

See also
List of Billboard Rhythmic number-one songs of the 2010s
Anilingus

References

External links
 

2014 singles
2014 songs
Chris Brown songs
Jhené Aiko songs
Omarion songs
Maybach Music Group singles
Atlantic Records singles
Songs written by Ty Dolla Sign
Songs written by Mustard (record producer)
Songs written by Chris Brown
Song recordings produced by Mustard (record producer)
Songs written by Omarion
Songs written by Jhené Aiko